Bridges in the United Kingdom is a link page for significant road bridges or footbridges in the United Kingdom.

 Significant railway bridges are listed under List of railway bridges and viaducts in the United Kingdom.
 Significant canal aqueducts are listed under List of canal aqueducts in the United Kingdom.

England

Greater London

Rest of England

England and Wales

England and Scotland

Scotland

Glasgow
All bridges are over the River Clyde unless otherwise specified.

Rest of Scotland

Northern Ireland

Wales

Brecon, Usk Bridge
Britannia Bridge
Briton Ferry Bridge, carries the M4 over the River Neath south of the town of Neath
Cardiff, Cardiff Bridge
Conwy Suspension Bridge, by Thomas Telford
Menai Suspension Bridge, by Thomas Telford
Monnow Bridge, Monmouth
Newport Bridge
Newport, Caerleon Bridge
Newport, City Bridge
Newport City footbridge
Newport, George Street Bridge
Newport, M4 motorway Usk bridge
Newport Transporter Bridge
Waterloo Bridge, Betws-y-Coed, by Thomas Telford

Isle of Man

See also
List of railway bridges and viaducts in the United Kingdom
List of canal aqueducts in the United Kingdom
List of lattice girder bridges in the United Kingdom
List of tunnels in the United Kingdom
List of bridges by country

Further lists
 :Category:Bridges across the River Wear
 Crossings of the River Severn
 :Category:Crossings of the River Tees
 :Category:Crossings of the River Tyne
 Crossings of the River Thames
 List of bridges in Cambridge
 List of bridges in London
 Bridges of York
 List of bridges over the River Torridge
 List of bridges designed by John Carr

References